The Samnaun Alps are a mountain range of the Central Eastern Alps, named after the Swiss municipality of Samnaun. They are located at the border of the Austrian state of Tyrol and the Graubünden canton of Switzerland.

The Samnaun Alps are separated from the Sesvenna Alps in the south by the Engadine Valley; from the Silvretta Alps in the west by the Fimber Pass; from the Verwall Alps and the Lechtal Alps in the north by the Paznauntal; from the Ötztal Alps in the east by the Inn valley. All the range is drained by the river Inn, through the Trisanna, Schergenbach, Brancla and Fimbabach.

Peaks

The range includes the following peaks:

For a list of passes, see Passes of the Silvretta and Rätikon Ranges.

See also
Swiss Alps
List of mountains in Switzerland

 
Mountain ranges of the Alps
Central Alps
Mountain ranges of Tyrol (state)
Mountain ranges of Graubünden
Landeck District
Austria–Switzerland border